Lieutenant-Colonel Arthur N. Lee, DSO, OBE, (August 1877- October 1954) was the British military censor in France of paintings by official British war artists during World War I from 1916 to the Peace.

Biography

Lee was born in Southwell, Nottinghamshire and attended Trinity College, Cambridge, graduating in 1899 and subsequently qualified as a solicitor before becoming a director of the Sheffield cutlery manufacturers Walker & Hall. He was a territorial officer with the Sherwood Foresters from 1903 and on the outbreak of World War I was mobilised with his regiment and sent to the Western Front. In 1916 he served as a Major in Dublin where the Sherwood Foresters suffered heavy losses during the Easter Rising and was awarded the DSO. He was then transferred to the HQ of the British Expeditionary Force as a Lieutenant-Colonel where he was appointed military censor. He had several well-recorded disputes with war artists, particularly William Orpen and Christopher Nevinson whose Paths of Glory Lee attempted to censor. Nevinson, however, still exhibited the work at a London exhibition in 1918 with a piece of brown paper across it bearing the word "Censored". Lee was awarded an OBE for his war work.
 
After the war, Lee returned to Sheffield and his cutlery firm. In 1932 he served as Master Cutler of the Company of Cutlers. Lee, who had become a friend of William Orpen continued the friendship until Orpen's death in 1931 and was responsible for commissioning Orpen to paint Edward, Prince of Wales in 1923 on behalf of The Royal and Ancient Golf Club of St Andrews of which Lee was a committee member. Lee's personal papers were donated to the Imperial War Museum after his death, by his son Peter Murray Lee who had served as an intelligence officer in World War II.

References

1877 births
1954 deaths
Alumni of Trinity College, Cambridge
British Army personnel of World War I
Censorship in the arts
Painting controversies
People from Southwell, Nottinghamshire
Sherwood Foresters officers
Master Cutlers
Military personnel from Nottinghamshire